Mohamed Wildhan is a former football player, who played for Maldives. He was the top scorer in 1999 SAFF Championship.

References

Maldivian footballers
Maldives international footballers
Living people
Year of birth missing (living people)
Association footballers not categorized by position